Mohammad Tip (also Romanized as Moḩammad Tip, Moḩammad Tīb, and Moḩammad Tib) is a village in Doab Rural District, in the Central District of Selseleh County, Lorestan Province, Iran. At the 2006 census, its population was 98, in 19 families.

References 

Towns and villages in Selseleh County